Edward Lawrence Katzenbach (October 2, 1878 – December 18, 1934) was the Attorney General of New Jersey from 1924 to 1929. He was the brother of  New Jersey Supreme Court Justice Frank S. Katzenbach and the father of United States Attorney General Nicholas Katzenbach.

Biography
Katzenbach was born in 1878 in Trenton, New Jersey, to Frank Snowden Katzenbach and Augusta (Mushbach) Katzenbach. He attended the State Model School and graduated from Princeton University in 1900. After graduation, he was appointed a fellow and instructor in political economy. He then attended Harvard Law School and graduated in 1905.

In November 1911 he married Marie Louise Hilson (December 8, 1882 – February 4, 1970) who later became the first female president of the State Board of Education. They had two sons: Edward Lawrence Katzenbach, Jr. (February 24, 1919 – April 23, 1974), who served as Deputy Assistant Secretary of Defense for Education and Manpower Resources under John F. Kennedy, and  Nicholas Katzenbach (January 17, 1922 – May 8, 2012), United States Attorney General and Under Secretary of State under Lyndon B. Johnson. 

In 1922 Katzenbach was appointed by Governor Edward I. Edwards to the State Board of Institutions and Agencies. He resigned from the board in February 1924 when he was appointed by Governor George S. Silzer to be Attorney General. He served in that position for a five-year term, until 1929.

From 1929 Katzenbach was a lecturer in politics at Princeton. He was also on the board of trustees of Rutgers University. In 1934 he died at his Trenton home after an extended illness at the age of 56.

References

External links

1878 births
1934 deaths
Politicians from Trenton, New Jersey
Princeton University alumni
Harvard Law School alumni
New Jersey Attorneys General
Katzenbach family